Psoloptera thoracica is a moth in the subfamily Arctiinae. It was described by Francis Walker in 1854. It is found in Panama, Ecuador and Tefé, Brazil.

References

Moths described in 1854
Euchromiina
Arctiinae of South America